Paul Beumer (born May 9, 1982) is a Dutch artist. His non-traditional artistic process includes manual resist-dyeing techniques to create abstract patterns which are described as a reminiscent of "Western High Modernism in that they allow for doubt, failure and chance." Beumer, himself, describes his works as “humble and simple in its forms.” He is presently a resident at 16/16 in Lagos, Nigeria and Schoolhouse in Mutianyu, China.

Education 
Beumer received his BFA from the Royal Academy of Art in The Hague and completed a two-year residency at the Rijksakademie van beeldende kunsten in Amsterdam.

Selected works 
Beumer's work has been featured in exhibitions at numerous galleries and institutions around the world including:

ARCO Madrid (2019) – Dürst Britt & Mayhew, Madrid, Spain 
He wanted kisses, but all he got was analytical anecdotes and philosophic epigrams (2018) - Taipei, Taiwan 
The message of the flower is the flower (2017) – Dürst Britt & Mayhew, The Hague, Netherlands 
Liquid Mountain (2016) – Museum Het Valkhof, Nijmegen, Netherlands 
Paint Wide Mouth White (2016) – Qingyun International Art Centre, Beijing, China 
Mister Motley Salon (2016) – Mister Motley, Online 
In the shade of the elms and willows, my friends drink until they are inspired (2016) – Goethe Pavillon, Palais Schardt, Germany 
Amsterdam Art Fair (2016) – Dürst Britt & Mayhew, Amsterdam, Netherlands 
Dry Landscape (2015) – Chinese European Art Center (CEAC), Xiamen, China 
Sigh, The Others (2015) – Ex Carcere Le Nuove, Turin, Italy 
I won’t have the luxury of seeing scenes like this much longer (2015) – Dürst Britt & Mayhew, The Hague, Netherlands 
Tomorrow’s Harvest (2015) – Bosse & Baum, London, United Kingdom 
Paul Beumer & Tim Breukers (2012) – Walden Affairs, The Hague, Netherlands 
Watching the Third World Slide By Through the Prism of a Champagne Glass (2011) – Galerie De Expeditie, Amsterdam, Netherlands 
The Empire on which the Sun Never Sets (2010) – Wetering Galerie, Amsterdam, Netherlands

Selected grants and awards 
Beumer has been honoured for his work across his career including:

 PRO Research Grant (2016) – Stroom, The Hague, Netherlands
 Stipend for Depth Development Artistic Practice (2015) – Mondriaan Fund, Amsterdam, Netherlands
 Grant for Post-academic Development Artistic Practice (2013) – Culture Fund Grant Mondriaan Fund, Amsterdam, Netherlands
 Prince Bernhard Culture Fund (2013) – Amsterdam, Netherlands
 Nomination, De Scheffer (2013) – Dordrecht, Netherlands
 Stipend Program for Emerging Artists (2012) – Mondriaan Fund, Amsterdam, Netherlands
 Nomination, Royal Award for Contemporary Painting (2009) – Amsterdam, Netherlands
 Nomination, Start Point Prize, Galerie Klatovy / Klenová (2009) – Janovice nad Úhlavou, Czech Republic

References

External links 

 Paul Beumer's official website
 Paul Beumer on Artsy

1982 births
Living people
Dutch artists